Carlos José Veglio (born 27 August 1946, in Buenos Aires) is a former Argentine football striker. He won a number of major titles with San Lorenzo and Boca Juniors and represented the Argentina national football team.

Playing career

Early years

Veglio started his professional career in 1964 in the Argentine 2nd division with Deportivo Español. In 1966, the club won promotion to the Primera División Argentina he played in the Primera during the 1967 season.

San Lorenzo

In 1968, Veglio won his first title with San Lorenzo in his first year on the team. He helped the club to win the Metropolitano without losing a single game, making them the first unbeaten champions in the professional era of Argentine football.

In 1972 Veglio was part of the San Lorenzo team that won both of the Argentine league titles, this time they completed the Nacional championship without losing a game.

Veglio won his fourth title with San Lorenzo in 1974, the club won the Nacional championship. Veglio is one of only five players to have won four league championships with San Lorenzo, the others being Sergio Villar, Victorio Cocco, Roberto Telch and Agustín Irusta.

Boca Juniors

In 1976, Veglio joined Boca Juniors where he went on to win five titles in his time at the club. Boca won the 1976 Metropolitano and the 1976 Nacional, they won the Copa Libertadores in 1977 and 1978, and the Copa Intercontinental in 1977. In 1979, Veglio was loaned to Universidad in Venezuela but he returned to Boca in 1980.

Later years

In 1981, Veglio had a spell in Mexico with Club León and then played in Paraguay with Cerro Porteño. In 1982, he returned to Argentina and finished his career with Gimnasia y Esgrima de Jujuy.

Titles as a player

Coaching career

After retiring as a player, Veglio turned his hand to coaching, he has worked on the backroom staff at Boca Juniors and at Atlético Madrid, and was the field assistant to Carlos Bianchi.

External links

Boca Juniors profile 
Boca Junior stats at Historiadeboca.com.ar 

1946 births
Living people
Footballers from Buenos Aires
Argentine people of Italian descent
Argentine footballers
Association football forwards
Deportivo Español footballers
San Lorenzo de Almagro footballers
Boca Juniors footballers
Cerro Porteño players
Gimnasia y Esgrima de Jujuy footballers
Argentine Primera División players
Copa Libertadores-winning players
Argentine expatriate footballers
Expatriate footballers in Mexico
Expatriate footballers in Paraguay
Expatriate footballers in Venezuela
Argentina international footballers